Sam Kolias is the chairman and CEO of Boardwalk REIT.

In 2006, Kolias and his brother Van, Senior Vice-President of Quality Control of Boardwalk, were at #81 of the top 100 richest people in Canada as compiled by Canadian Business magazine.

References

Year of birth missing (living people)
Living people
Canadian chief executives
Place of birth missing (living people)